The turret snake eel (Brachysomophis umbonis) is an eel in the family Ophichthidae (worm/snake eels). It was described by John E. McCosker and John Ernest Randall in 2001. It is a marine, tropical eel which is known from the Indo-Western Pacific, including Indonesia and the Philippines.

The species epithet, "umbonis", meaning "rounded protuberance" in Latin, refers to the prominent lateral projections of the eel's cheeks.

References

Ophichthidae
Fish described in 2001
Taxa named by John E. McCosker
Taxa named by John Ernest Randall